Billy Higgins (born 15 March 1940) is a Scottish former footballer. He played at wing half for Hearts including 197 league appearances. He emigrated to South Africa in 1967 to play for Durban City.

References

External links 

Hearts player Billy Higgins, London Hearts Supporters' Club

1940 births
Living people
Footballers from Edinburgh
Association football wing halves
Scottish footballers
Heart of Midlothian F.C. players
Scottish Football League players
Scottish expatriate footballers
Expatriate soccer players in South Africa
Scotland under-23 international footballers
Scottish expatriate sportspeople in South Africa
Durban City F.C. players
Scottish Football League representative players